The anhinga (Anhinga anhinga), sometimes called snakebird, darter, American darter, or water turkey, is a water bird of the warmer parts of the Americas. The word anhinga comes from a'ñinga in the Brazilian Tupi language and means "devil bird" or "snake bird". The origin of the name is apparent when swimming: only the neck appears above water so the bird looks like a snake ready to strike. They do not have external nares (nostrils) and breathe solely through their epiglottis.

The anhinga is placed in the darter family, Anhingidae, and is closely related to Indian (Anhinga melanogaster), African (Anhinga rufa), and Australian (Anhinga novaehollandiae) darters. Like other darters, the anhinga hunts by spearing fish and other small prey using its sharp, slender beak.

Distribution and migration
Anhinga species are found all over the world in warm shallow waters. The American anhinga has been subdivided into two subspecies, A. a. anhinga and A. a. leucogaster, based on their location. A. a. anhinga can be found mainly east of the Andes in South America and also the islands of Trinidad and Tobago. A. a. leucogaster can be found in the southern United States, Mexico, Cuba, and Grenada. A fossil species Anhinga walterbolesi has been described from the Late Oligocene to Early Miocene of Australia.

Only birds that live in the extreme north and south of their range migrate and do so based on temperature and available sunlight. Anhingas will migrate towards the equator during winter but this range is "determined by the amount of sunshine to warm the chilled birds". Although not in their usual range, anhingas have been found as far north as the states of Pennsylvania and Wisconsin in the United States.

Kettles of anhingas often migrate with other birds and have been described as resembling black paper gliders.

Description
The A. a. anhinga subspecies is larger than A. a. leucogaster and has broader buffy tail tips. The bill is relatively long (about twice the length of the head), sharply pointed, and yellow, and the webbed feet are yellow as well.

The male is a glossy black-green with the wings, base of wings, and tail a glossy black-blue. The tip of the tail is white. The back of the head and the neck have elongated feathers that have been described as gray or light purple-white. The upper back of the body and wings is spotted or streaked with white.

The female anhinga is similar to the male except that it has a pale gray-buff or light brown head, neck, and upper chest. The lower chest or breast is a chestnut color, and the back is browner than that of the male.

The hatchling starts out bald but gains tan down within a few days of hatching. Within two weeks the tan down is replaced by white down. Three weeks after hatching, the first juvenile feathers appear. Juveniles are mostly brown until they first breed usually after the second or third winter.

This bird is often mistaken for the double-crested cormorant due to its similar size and shape, although the two species can be differentiated by their tails and bills. The tail of the anhinga is wider and much longer than that of the cormorant. The bill of the anhinga is pointed, while the bill of the cormorant has a hook-tip.

Behavior
Anhingas swim with their webbed feet and pursue their prey, fish, under water and spear their prey by rapidly stretching out their neck. They come up to handle and swallow fish. Unlike ducks, ospreys and pelicans which coat their feathers with oil from their uropygial gland, the anhinga does not have waterproof feathers. Their feathers get soaked upon immersion in water. Therefore, they cannot stay floating on water for long periods of time. Their dense bones, wetted plumage and neutral buoyancy in water, allows them to fully submerge and search for underwater prey.

The anhinga cannot fly any extended distances with wet feathers. If it attempts to fly while its wings are wet, the anhinga has difficulty, flapping vigorously while "running" on the water for a short distance, often to avoid any perceived threats.  Like cormorants, the anhinga stands with wings spread and feathers fanned open in a semicircular shape, facing away from the sun, to dry its feathers and absorb heat.  Anhingas lose body heat relatively fast and their posture helps them absorb solar radiation from the sun to counter this. Because an anhinga in the drying position resembles a male turkey, it has been colloquially referred to as the 'water turkey' or 'swamp turkey'.

Diet 
Anhingas feed on moderately sized wetland fishes, amphibians, aquatic invertebrates and insects. In Alabama, the anhinga's diet consists of fishes (such as mullet, sunfish, black bass, catfish, suckers, and chain pickerel), crayfish, crabs, shrimp, aquatic insects, tadpoles, water snakes and small terrapins. In Florida, sunfishes and bass, killifishes, and live-bearing fishes are primarily eaten by the anhingas. Other fish eaten include pupfish and percids.

Anhingas stalk fish underwater, mainly where there is some flora present. Once they locate their prey, they partly open their bill and stab the fish swiftly. For larger fish, they use both their jaws and use the lower jaw on small fish. If the fish is too large to forage, the anhinga stabs it repeatedly and then lets it go. The anhingas bring their capture to the surface of the water, toss it backwards and engulf it head-first.

Conservation status
The anhinga is protected in the US under the Migratory Bird Treaty Act of 1918. The number of individual anhingas has not been estimated but they are considered to be of least concern because of the frequency of their occurrence in their  global range.

References

External links

 
 
 
 

Anhingidae
Birds of the Americas
Native birds of the Southeastern United States
Mangrove fauna
Birds described in 1766
Taxa named by Carl Linnaeus
Extant Pleistocene first appearances